This is a list of elections in Canada scheduled to be held in 2020. Included are municipal, provincial and federal elections, by-elections on any level, referendums and party leadership races at any level. In bold are provincewide or federal elections (including provincewide municipal elections) and party leadership races.

January through March
January 13: Municipal by-election in Wabamun, Alberta (cancelled due to acclamation)
January 18: Sea to Sky School District by-election
January 20: Municipal by-election in Olds, Alberta 
January 25: Kootenay-Columbia School District by-election
January 27: 
Municipal by-election in Sioux Lookout, Ontario
Municipal by-election in Fox Creek, Alberta
February 3: Municipal by-election in Murray Harbour, Prince Edward Island (cancelled due to acclamation)
February 7: Municipal by-election in Division 2, Municipal District of Lesser Slave River, Alberta
February 10: Mayoral by-election in Hall Beach, Nunavut
February 15: 
Municipal by-election in Squamish-Lillooet Regional District, British Columbia
Shishalh Nation Chief and Council election
February 22: Municipal by-election in Tahsis, British Columbia
February 23: Municipal by-election in Lac-Blouin/Centre-ville District, Val-d'Or, Quebec
February 24: Municipal by-election in Ward 3, Barrie, Ontario
February 27: Provincial by-elections in Ottawa—Vanier and Orléans, Ontario
February 29: Municipal by-elections in Zeballos and Bulkley-Nechako Regional District, British Columbia
March 1: Municipal by-election in District 3, Mille-Isles, Quebec
March 7:
Municipal elections in the West Hants Regional Municipality, Nova Scotia.
Ontario Liberal Party leadership election
March 10: Provincial by-elections in Cape Breton Centre and Truro-Bible Hill-Millbrook-Salmon River, Nova Scotia
March 15: Municipal by-election in Saint-Léonard-Est District, Montreal (postponed until 2021 due to the COVID-19 pandemic in Montreal)
March 21: Winnipeg School Division School Trustee Elections (Wards 3 & 4) (cancelled due to the COVID-19 pandemic in Manitoba)
March 23: Municipal by-election in Ward 7, Cambridge, Ontario (postponed due to the COVID-19 pandemic in Ontario) 
March 25: Municipal by-election in Carrot River, Saskatchewan (postponed due to the COVID-19 pandemic in Saskatchewan)
March 30: Fort Vermilion School Division school trustee by-election (cancelled due to acclamation).

April through June
April 4:
Municipal by-election District 6, Eastern Shelburne County, Nova Scotia (postponed due to the COVID-19 pandemic in Nova Scotia)
Municipal by-elections in Rossland and Victoria, British Columbia (postponed due to the COVID-19 pandemic in British Columbia)
April 27: Municipal by-election in Ward 7, Windsor, Ontario (postponed due to the COVID-19 pandemic in Ontario)
May 11: New Brunswick municipal elections (postponed to 2021 due to the COVID-19 pandemic in New Brunswick)
May 23: Yukon Party leadership election
June 8: Municipal by-election in Innisfail, Alberta
June 15: Provincial by-elections in Saint Croix and Shediac Bay-Dieppe, New Brunswick (postponed due to the COVID-19 pandemic in New Brunswick)
June 15–26: Green Party of British Columbia leadership election (postponed due to the COVID-19 pandemic in British Columbia)

July through September
July 24: Territorial by-elections in Baker Lake and Kugluktuk, Nunavut (cancelled; both candidates acclaimed)
August 3: Liberal Party of Newfoundland and Labrador leadership election
August 21: Conservative Party of Canada leadership election (postponed from June 27 due to the COVID-19 pandemic in Canada)
August 24: Pangnirtung, Nunavut mayoral by-election.
August 29: 
Kitigan Zibi Anishinabeg First Nation band council election.
Saskatchewan municipal elections in resort villages 
September 12: 
Arrow Lakes School District by-election.
Yuułuʔiłʔatḥ Government legislative by-election
September 5–13: Green Party of British Columbia leadership election (postponed from June 26 due to the COVID-19 pandemic in British Columbia)
September 14: 
New Brunswick general election
Mayoral and Ward 2 council by-election in North Shore, Ontario
September 15: Municipal by-election in Ward 1, Pelham, Ontario
September 25: 
Municipal by-election in Alexandria Ward, North Glengarry, Ontario
Municipal by-election in Ward 5, Rural Municipality of Taché, Manitoba
September 26: Mayoral by-election in Fort St. James, British Columbia

October
October 3: Green Party of Canada leadership election
October 4: Mayoral by-elections in Drummondville (cancelled; candidate acclaimed) and L'Ancienne-Lorette, Quebec (suspended)
October 5: Municipal by-elections in Cumberland Ward, Ottawa, Ward 7 in Windsor, Ontario and Ward 7 in Cambridge, Ontario. 
October 6: Provincial by-election in Humber-Gros Morne, Newfoundland and Labrador
October 9: Parti Québécois leadership election
October 10: Municipal and mayoral by-elections in Greenwood, British Columbia
October 13: Municipal by-election in Thompson, Manitoba
October 17: 
Nova Scotia municipal elections
Municipal by-elections in Dawson Creek and Smithers, British Columbia (mayor and councillor)
October 18: Asbestos, Quebec name change referendum.
October 19: 
York Region District School Board by-election for the seat of Richmond Hill Wards 1, 2 & 4.
Municipal by-election in Crossfield, Alberta
October 20: Municipal by-election in Ward 2, St. John's, Newfoundland and Labrador
October 24: 
British Columbia general election
Mayoral by-election in Lake Cowichan, British Columbia
October 26: 
Municipal by-election in Crowsnest Pass, Alberta
Federal by-elections in Toronto Centre and York Centre
Saskatchewan general election

November through December
November 2: Provincial by-election in Charlottetown-Winsloe, Prince Edward Island.
November 4: Brandon School Division Ward 1 Board of Trustees by-election.
November 9: 
Saskatchewan municipal elections
Arviat and Coral Harbour, Nunavut Liquor Plebiscites
November 12: Municipal election in Swift Current, Saskatchewan (delayed from Nov. 9 due to snowstorm) 
November 13: Municipal election in Saskatoon, Saskatchewan (delayed from Nov. 9 due to snowstorm)
November 14: Municipal by-election in Port Clements, British Columbia
November 16: Municipal election in Maple Creek, Saskatchewan (delayed from Nov. 9 due to snowstorm)
November 21: Municipal by-elections in Queen Charlotte and Sayward, British Columbia
November 28: Municipal by-elections in the Cowichan Valley Regional District (Area H) and Rossland, British Columbia
December 5: Municipal by-election in Grand Forks, British Columbia
December 7: Municipal by-election in Ward 2, Bradford West Gwillimbury, Ontario
December 12: Comox Valley School District by-election and municipal by-election in Victoria, British Columbia
December 13: Mayoral by-election in L'Ancienne-Lorette and municipal by-election in Du Faubourg District, Sorel-Tracy, Quebec
December 14: Northwest Territories municipal elections (hamlets only)
December 19: Municipal by-election in Lytton, British Columbia

References

External links
BC Local by-elections
Quebec municipal by-elections
Government of Canada election calendar

 
Political timelines of the 2020s by year